Rex Lloyd Forehand (born September 17, 1945) is an American psychologist. He is the Heinz and Rowena Ansbacher Endowed Professor and University Distinguished Professor of Psychological Science at the University of Vermont, where he is also the director of the Vermont Genetics Network. He previously taught at the University of Georgia for over thirty years, where he served as Distinguished Research Professor and, subsequently, as Regents Professor. He was also the director of the University of Georgia's Institute for Behavioral Research for nine years. In 2008, he received the Award for Distinguished Career Contributions to Education and Training in Psychology from the American Psychological Association.

References

External links
Faculty page

Living people
1945 births
21st-century American psychologists
People from Enterprise, Alabama
University of Alabama alumni
University of Vermont faculty
University of Georgia faculty
20th-century American psychologists